The N1/L3 (from  , "Carrier Rocket"; Cyrillic: Н1) was a super heavy-lift launch vehicle intended to deliver payloads beyond low Earth orbit. The N1 was the Soviet counterpart to the US Saturn V and was intended to enable crewed travel to the Moon and beyond, with studies beginning as early as 1959. Its first stage, Block A, remains the most powerful rocket stage ever flown (the first stage of SpaceX's Starship is the most powerful rocket stage built at 17 Mlbf thrust). However, all four first stages flown failed mid-flight because a lack of static test firings meant that plumbing issues and other adverse characteristics with the large cluster of thirty engines and its complex fuel and oxidizer feeder system were not revealed earlier in development.

The N1-L3 version was designed to compete with the United States Apollo program to land a person on the Moon, using a similar lunar orbit rendezvous method. The basic N1 launch vehicle had three stages, which were to carry the L3 lunar payload into low Earth orbit with two cosmonauts. The L3 contained one stage for trans-lunar injection; another stage used for mid-course corrections, lunar orbit insertion, and the first part of the descent to the lunar surface; a single-pilot LK Lander spacecraft; and a two-pilot Soyuz 7K-LOK lunar orbital spacecraft for return to Earth.

The N1-L3 was underfunded and rushed, starting development in October 1965, almost four years after the Saturn V. The project was badly derailed by the death of its chief designer Sergei Korolev in 1966. Each of the four attempts to launch an N1 failed, with the second attempt resulting in the vehicle crashing back onto its launch pad shortly after liftoff. The N1 program was suspended in 1974, and officially canceled in 1976. All details of the Soviet crewed lunar programs were kept secret until the USSR was nearing collapse in 1989.

History

In 1967 the United States and the Soviet Union were in a race to be first to land a human on the Moon. The N1/L3 program received formal approval in 1964, which required development of the N1 launch vehicle, comparable in size to the American Saturn V.

On Nov. 25, 1967, less than three weeks after the first Saturn V flight during the Apollo 4 mission, the Soviets rolled out an N1 mockup to the newly constructed launch pad 110R at the Baikonur Cosmodrome in Soviet Kazakhstan. This Facilities Systems Logistic Test and Training Vehicle, designated 1M1, was designed to give engineers valuable experience in the rollout, launch pad integration, and rollback activities, similar to the Saturn V Facilities Integration Vehicle SA-500F testing at the Kennedy Space Center in Florida in mid-1966. While the crawler transported the Saturn V to the pad vertically, the N1 made the trip horizontally and was then raised to the vertical position at the pad – a standard practice in the Soviet space program. On December 11, after completion of various tests, the N1 rocket was lowered and rolled back to the assembly building. The 1M1 mockup was used repeatedly in the following years for additional launchpad integration tests. 

Although this test was carried out in secret, a US reconnaissance satellite photographed the N1 on the pad shortly before its rollback to the assembly building. NASA Administrator James Webb had access to this and other similar intelligence that showed that the Russians were seriously planning crewed lunar missions. That knowledge influenced several key US decisions in the coming months. The satellite imagery appeared to show the USSR was close to a flight test of the N1, but did not reveal that this particular rocket was just a mockup and that the USSR was many months behind the US in the race to land a human on the Moon. The Soviets were hopeful that they could carry out a test flight of the N1 in the first half of 1968, but for a variety of technical reasons the attempt did not occur for more than a year.

 (though, at the very least, the CIA, the NRO, and President Lyndon Johnson did know that the rocket was a mockup per the 12-27-67 daily presidential briefing)

Early Soviet lunar concepts

In May 1961, the US announced the goal of landing a person on the Moon by 1970. During the same month, the On Reconsideration of the Plans for Space Vehicles in the Direction of Defense Purposes report set the first test launch of the N1 rocket for 1965. In June, Korolev was given a small amount of funding to start N1 development between 1961 and 1963. At the same time, Korolev proposed a lunar mission based on the new Soyuz spacecraft using an Earth orbit rendezvous profile. Several Soyuz rocket launches would be used to build up a complete Moon mission package, including one for the Soyuz spacecraft, another for the lunar lander, and a few with cislunar engines and fuel. This approach, driven by the limited capacity of the Soyuz rocket, meant that a rapid launch rate would be required to assemble the complex before any of the components ran out of consumables on-orbit. Korolev subsequently proposed that the N1 be enlarged to allow a single launch lunar landing. In November-December 1961, Korolev and others tried to further argue that a super heavy lift rocket could deliver ultra heavy nuclear weapons, such as the just tested Tsar Bomba, or many warheads (up to 17) as further justification for the N1 design. Korolev was not inclined to use the rocket for military uses, but wanted to fulfill his space ambitions and saw military support as vital. The military response was lukewarm – they thought the N1 had little military usefulness and was worried it would divert funds away from pure military uses. Korolev's correspondence with military leaders continued until February 1962 with little progress.

Meanwhile, Chelomei's OKB-52 proposed an alternate mission with much lower risk. Instead of a crewed landing, Chelomei proposed a series of circumlunar missions to beat the US to the vicinity of the Moon. He also proposed a new booster for the mission, clustering three of his existing UR-200s (known as the SS-10 in the west) to produce a single larger booster, the UR-500. These plans were dropped when Glushko offered Chelomei the RD-270, which allowed the construction of the UR-500 in a much simpler "monoblock" design. He also proposed adapting an existing spacecraft design for the circumlunar mission, the single-cosmonaut LK-1. Chelomei felt that improvements in early UR-500/LK-1 missions would allow the spacecraft to be adapted for two cosmonauts.

The Strategic Missile Forces of the Soviet military was reluctant to support a politically motivated project with little military utility, but both Korolev and Chelomei pushed for a lunar mission. Between 1961 and 1964, Chelomei's less aggressive proposal was accepted, and development of his UR-500 and the LK-1 were given a relatively high priority.

Lunar N1 development starts
Valentin Glushko, who then held a near-monopoly on rocket engine design in the Soviet Union, proposed the RD-270 engine using unsymmetrical dimethylhydrazine (UDMH) and nitrogen tetroxide (N2O4) propellants to power the newly enlarged N1 design. These hypergolic propellants ignite on contact, reducing the complexity of the engine, and were widely used in Glushko's existing engines on various ICBMs. The full flow staged combustion cycle RD-270 was in testing before program cancellation, achieving a higher specific impulse than the gas-generator cycle Rocketdyne F-1 despite the use of UDMH/N2O4 propellants with lower potential impulse. The F-1 engine was five years into its development at the time and still experiencing combustion stability problems.

Glushko pointed out that the US Titan II GLV had successfully flown crew with similar hypergolic propellants. Korolev felt that the toxic nature of the fuels and their exhaust presented a safety risk for crewed space flight, and that kerosene/LOX was a better solution. The disagreement between Korolev and Glushko over the question of fuels ultimately became a major issue that hampered progress.

Personal issues between the two played a role, with Korolev holding Glushko responsible for his incarceration at the Kolyma Gulag in the 1930s and Glushko considering Korolev to be cavalier and autocratic towards things outside his competence. The difference of opinions led to a falling out between Korolev and Glushko. In 1962, a committee was appointed to resolve the dispute and agreed with Korolev. Glushko refused outright to work on LOX/kerosene engines, and with Korolev in general. Korolev eventually gave up and decided to enlist the help of Nikolai Kuznetsov, the OKB-276 jet engine designer, while Glushko teamed up with other rocket designers to build the very successful Proton, Zenit, and Energia rockets.

Kuznetsov, who had limited experience in rocket design, responded with the NK-15, a fairly small engine that would be delivered in several versions tuned to different altitudes. To achieve the required amount of thrust, it was proposed that 30 NK-15s would be used in a clustered configuration. An outer ring of 24 engines and an inner ring of six engines would be separated by an air gap, with airflow supplied via inlets near the top of the booster. The air would be mixed with the exhaust in order to provide some degree of thrust augmentation, as well as engine cooling. The arrangement of 30 rocket engine nozzles on the N1's first stage could have been an attempt at creating a crude version of a toroidal aerospike engine system; more conventional aerospike engines were also studied.

N1-L3 lunar complex

Korolev proposed a larger N1 combined with the new L3 lunar package based on the Soyuz 7K-L3. The L3 combined rocket stages, the modified Soyuz, and the new LK lunar lander were to be launched by a single N1 to conduct a lunar landing. Chelomei responded with a clustered UR-500-derived vehicle, topped with the L1 spacecraft already under development, and a lander developed by his design bureau. Korolev's proposal was selected as the winner in August 1964, but Chelomei was told to continue with his circumlunar UR-500/L1 work.

When Khrushchev was overthrown later in 1964, infighting between the two teams started anew. In October 1965, the Soviet government ordered a compromise; the circumlunar mission would be launched on Chelomei's UR-500 using Korolev's Soyuz spacecraft in place of their own Zond ("probe") design, aiming for a launch in 1967, the 50th anniversary of the Bolshevik Revolution. Korolev, meanwhile, would continue with his original N1-L3 proposal. Korolev had clearly won the argument, but work on the L1 continued anyway, as well as the Zond.

Korolev lobbied in 1964 for a crewed circumlunar mission, which was at first rejected, but was passed with the 3 August 1964 Central Committee resolution  titled "On work involving the study of the Moon and outer space", with the objective of landing a cosmonaut on the Moon in 1967 or '68.

In January 1966, Korolev died due to complications of minor surgery. His work on N1-L3 was taken over by his deputy, Vasily Mishin, who did not have Korolev's political astuteness or influence, and was reputed to be a heavy drinker. These problems contributed to the eventual cancellation of the N1 and the lunar mission as a whole, as did four consecutive launch failures with no successes.

N1 vehicle serial numbers

 N1 1L – full scale dynamic test model, each stage was individually dynamically tested; the full N1 stack was only tested at 1/4 scale.
 N1 2L (1M1) – Facilities Systems Logistic Test and Training Vehicle (FSLT & TV); two first stages painted gray, third stage gray-white and L3 white.
 N1 3L – first launch attempt, engine fire, exploded at 12 km.
 N1 4L – Block A LOX tank developed cracks; never launched, parts from Block A used for other launchers; rest of airframe structure scrapped.
 N1 5L – partially painted gray; first night launch; launch failure destroyed pad 110 East.
 N1 6L – launched from the second pad 110 West, deficient roll control, destroyed after 51s.
 N1 7L – all white, last launch attempt; engine cutoff at  caused propellant line hammering, rupturing the fuel system.
 N1 8L and 9L – flight ready N1Fs with improved NK-33 engines in Block A, scrapped when the program was canceled.
 N1 10L – uncompleted, scrapped along with 8L and 9L.

N1F
Mishin continued with the N1F project after the cancellation of plans for a crewed Moon landing in the hope that the booster would be used to build the Zvezda moonbase. The program was terminated in 1974 when Mishin was replaced by Glushko. Two N1Fs were being readied for launch at the time, but these plans were canceled.

The two flight-ready N1Fs were scrapped and their remains could still be found around Baikonur years later used as shelters and storage sheds. The boosters were deliberately broken up in an effort to cover up the USSR's failed Moon attempts, which was publicly stated to be a paper project in order to fool the US into thinking there was a race going on. This cover story lasted until glasnost, when the remaining hardware was seen publicly on display.

Aftermath and engines
The program was followed by the "Vulkan" concept for a huge launch vehicle using Syntin/LOX propellants, later replaced by LH2/LOX on the 2nd and 3rd stages. "Vulkan" was superseded by the Energia/Buran program in 1976.

About 150 of the upgraded engines for the N1F escaped destruction. Although the rocket as a whole was unreliable, the NK-33 and NK-43 engines are rugged and reliable when used as a standalone unit. In the mid-1990s, Russia sold 36 engines for $1.1 million each and a license for the production of new engines to the US company Aerojet General.

The US company Kistler Aerospace worked on incorporating these engines into a new rocket design with the intention of offering commercial launch services, but the attempt ended in bankruptcy. Aerojet also modified the NK-33 to incorporate thrust vector control capability for Orbital Science's Antares launch vehicle. Antares used two of these modified AJ-26 engines for first stage propulsion. The first four launches of the Antares were successful, but on the fifth launch the rocket exploded shortly after launch. Preliminary failure analysis by Orbital pointed to a possible turbopump failure in one NK-33/AJ-26. Given Aerojet's previous problems with the NK-33/AJ-26 engine during the modification and test program (two engine failures in static test firings, one of which caused major damage to the test stand) and the later in-flight failure, Orbital decided that the NK-33/AJ-26 was not reliable enough for future use.

In Russia, N1 engines were not used again until 2004, when the remaining 70 or so engines were incorporated into a new rocket design, the Soyuz 3. , the project was frozen due to the lack of funding. Instead, the NK-33 was incorporated into the first stage of a light variant of the Soyuz rocket, which was first launched on 28 December 2013.

Description

The N1-L3 consisted of five stages in total: the first three (N1) for insertion into a low Earth parking orbit, and another two (L3) for translunar injection and lunar orbit insertion. The conical shaping of the lower stages was due to the arrangement of the tanks within, a smaller spherical kerosene tank on top of the larger liquid oxygen tank below.

During the N1's lifetime, a series of improved engines was introduced to replace those used in the original design. The resulting modified N1 was known as the N1F, but did not fly before the project's cancellation.

Block A first stage
The first stage, Block A, was powered by 30 NK-15 engines arranged in two rings, the main ring of 24 at the outer edge of the booster and the core propulsion system consisting of the inner 6 engines at about half diameter. The control system was primarily based on differential throttling of the engines of the outer ring for pitch and yaw. The core propulsion system was not used for control. The Block A also included four grid fins, which were later used on Soviet air-to-air missile designs. In total, the Block A produced  of thrust and could be regarded as a true Nova class first stage (Nova was the name used by NASA to describe a very large booster in the 10–20 million pounds of thrust range). This exceeded the  thrust of the Saturn V. However, this is only two-thirds of the 67.12 mN thrust from the first stage of SpaceX's Starship launch vehicle, the Super Heavy booster.

Engine control system
The KORD (Russian acronym for KOntrol Raketnykh Dvigateleyliterally "Control (of) Rocket Engines"Russian: Контроль ракетных двигателей) was the automatic engine control system devised to throttle, shut down and monitor the large cluster of 30 engines in Block A (the first stage). The KORD system controlled the differential thrusting of the outer ring of 24 engines for pitch and yaw attitude control by throttling them appropriately and it also shut down malfunctioning engines situated opposite each other. This was to negate the pitch or yaw moment diametrically opposing engines in the outer ring would generate, thus maintaining symmetrical thrust. Block A could perform nominally with two pairs of opposing engines shut down (26/30 engines). Unfortunately the KORD system was unable to react to rapidly occurring processes such as the exploding turbo-pump during the second launch. Due to the deficiencies of the KORD system, a new computer system was developed for the fourth and last launch. The S-530 was the first Soviet digital guidance and control system, but unlike the KORD, which was essentially just an analogue engine control system, the S-530 supervised all control tasks in the launch vehicle and spacecraft, of which the N1 carried two, one located in the Block V third stage that controlled the engines for the first three stages. The second S-530 was located in the Soyuz LOK command module and provided control for the rest of the mission from TLI to lunar flyby and return to Earth.

Block B second stage
The second stage, Block B, was powered by 8 NK-15V engines arranged in a single ring. The only major difference between the NK-15 and -15V was the engine bell and various tunings for air-start and high-altitude performance. The N1F Block B replaced the NK-15 engines with upgraded NK-43 engines.

Block B could withstand the shutdown of one pair of opposing engines (6/8 engines).

Block V third stage
The upper stage, Block V (В/V being the third letter in the Russian alphabet), mounted four smaller NK-21 engines in a square. The N1F Block V replaced the NK-21 engines with NK-31 engines.

Block V could function with one engine shut down and three functioning correctly.

Assembly, transport, erection, on-pad-servicing 
The N-1 was assembled horizontally, then moved on a transporter to the launch pad, and erected. There was a service tower/gantry at the pad with umbilical connections for liquid fuelling.

Development problems
The complex plumbing needed to feed fuel and oxidizer into the clustered arrangement of rocket engines was fragile and a major factor in 2 of the 4 launch failures. Unlike Kennedy Space Center Launch Complex 39, the N1's Baikonur Cosmodrome could not be reached by heavy barge. To allow transport by rail, all of the stages had to be shipped in pieces and assembled at the launch site. This led to difficulties in testing that contributed to the N1's lack of success.

The NK-15 engines had a number of valves that were activated by pyrotechnics rather than hydraulic or mechanical means, this being a weight-saving measure. Once shut, the valves could not be re-opened. This meant that the engines for Block A were only test-fired individually and the entire cluster of 30 engines was never static test fired as a unit. Sergei Khrushchev stated that only two out of every batch of six engines were tested, and not the units actually intended for use in the booster. As a result, the complex and destructive vibrational modes (which ripped apart propellant lines and turbines), as well as exhaust plume and fluid dynamic problems (causing vehicle roll, vacuum cavitation, and other problems), in Block A were not discovered and worked out before flight. Blocks B and V were static test fired as complete units.

Because of its technical difficulties and lack of funding for a comprehensive test campaign, the N1 never completed a test flight. Twelve test flights were planned, with only four flown. All four uncrewed launches ended in failure before first-stage separation. The longest flight lasted 107 seconds, just before first-stage separation. Two test launches occurred in 1969, one in 1971, and the final one in 1972.

Comparison with Saturn V

At , the N1-L3 was slightly shorter than the American Apollo-Saturn V. The N-1 had a smaller overall diameter but a greater maximum diameter ( vs. ). The N1 produced more thrust in each of its first three stages than the corresponding stages of the Saturn V. The N1-L3 produced more total impulse in its first four stages than the Saturn V did in its three (see table below).

The N1 was intended to place the approximately  L3 payload into low Earth orbit, with the fourth stage included in the L3 complex was intended to place  into translunar orbit.

The N1 used kerosene-based rocket fuel in all three of its main stages, while the Saturn V used liquid hydrogen to fuel its second and third stages, which yielded an overall performance advantage due to the higher specific impulse. The N1 also wasted available propellant volume by using spherical propellant tanks under a roughly conical external skin, while the Saturn V used most of its available cylindrical skin volume to house capsule-shaped hydrogen and oxygen tanks, with common bulkheads between the tanks in the second and third stages.

The N1-L3 would have been able to convert only 9.3% of its three-stage total impulse into Earth orbit payload momentum (compared to 12.14% for the Saturn V), and only 3.1% of its four-stage total impulse into translunar payload momentum, compared to 6.2% for the Saturn V.

The Saturn V also never lost a payload in two development and eleven operational launches, while four N1 development launch attempts all resulted in catastrophic failure, with two payload losses.

Launch history

First failure, serial 3L
February 21, 1969: serial number 3L – Zond L1S-1 (Soyuz 7K-L1S (Zond-M) modification of Soyuz 7K-L1 "Zond" spacecraft) for Moon flyby.

A few seconds into launch, a transient voltage caused the KORD to shut down Engine #12. After this happened, the KORD shut off Engine #24 to maintain symmetrical thrust. At T+6 seconds, pogo oscillation in the #2 engine tore several components off their mounts and started a propellant leak. At T+25 seconds, further vibrations ruptured a fuel line and caused RP-1 to spill into the aft section of the booster. When it came into contact with the leaking gas, a fire started. The fire then burned through wiring in the power supply, causing electrical arcing that was picked up by sensors and interpreted by the KORD as a pressurization problem in the turbopumps. The KORD responded by issuing a general command to shut down the entire first stage at T+68 seconds into launch. This signal was also transmitted up to the second and third stages, "locking" them and preventing a manual ground command from being sent to start their engines. Telemetry also showed that the power generators in the N-1 continued functioning until the impact with the ground at T+183 seconds. 

Investigators discovered the remains of the rocket 52 kilometers (32 miles)  from the launch pad. Vasily Mishin had initially blamed the generators for the failure, as he could not think of any other reason why all 30 engines would shut down at once, but this was quickly disproven by telemetry data and the recovery of the generators from the crash site. They had survived in good condition and were shipped back to the Istra plant, where they were refurbished and worked without any problems under bench testing. The investigative team did not speculate as to whether the burning first stage could have continued flying if the KORD system had not shut it down. 

The KORD was found to have a number of serious design flaws and poorly programmed logic. One unforeseen flaw was that its operating frequency, 1000 Hz, happened to perfectly coincide with vibration generated by the propulsion system, and the shutdown of Engine #12 at liftoff was believed to have been caused by pyrotechnic devices opening a valve, which produced a high-frequency oscillation that went into adjacent wiring and was assumed by the KORD to be an overspeed condition in the engine's turbopump. The wiring in Engine #12 was believed to be particularly vulnerable to this effect due to its length; however, other engines had similar wiring and were unaffected. Also, the system's operating voltage increased to 25V instead of the nominal 15V. The control wiring was relocated and coated with asbestos for fireproofing and the operating frequency changed. The launch escape system was activated and did its job properly, saving the mockup of the spacecraft. All subsequent flights had freon fire extinguishers installed next to every engine. According to Sergei Afanasiev, the logic of the command to shut down the entire cluster of 30 engines in Block A was incorrect in that instance, as the subsequent investigation revealed.

Second failure, serial 5L
Serial number 5L – Zond L1S-2 for Moon orbit and flyby and intended photography of possible crewed landing sites.

The second N-1 vehicle was launched on 3 July 1969 and carried a modified L1 Zond spacecraft and live escape tower. Boris Chertok claimed that a mass model lunar module was also carried; however, most sources indicate that only the L1S-2 and boost stages were on board N-1 5L. Launch took place at 23:18 Moscow time from launch pad 110 East. The flight lasted only a few moments; as soon as it cleared the tower, there was a flash of light, and debris could be seen falling from the bottom of the first stage. All engines instantly shut down except engine #18. This caused the N-1 to lean over at a 45-degree angle and drop back onto the pad. The nearly 2300 tons of propellant on board triggered a massive blast and shock wave that shattered windows across the launch complex and sent debris flying as far as 10 kilometers (6 miles) from the center of the explosion. Launch crews were permitted outside half an hour after the accident and encountered droplets of unburned fuel still raining down from the sky. The majority of the N-1's propellant load had not been consumed in the accident, and most of what had burned was in the first stage of the rocket. However, the worst-case scenario, mixing of the fuel and LOX to form an explosive gel, had not occurred. The subsequent investigation revealed that up to 85% of the propellant on board the rocket did not detonate, reducing the force of the blast. The launch escape system had activated at the moment of engine shutdown (T+15 seconds) and pulled the L1S-2 capsule to safety 2.0 kilometers (1.2 miles) away. Impact with the pad occurred at T+23 seconds. Launch Complex 110 East was thoroughly leveled by the blast, with the concrete pad caved in and one of the lighting towers knocked over and twisted around itself. Despite the devastation, most of the telemetry tapes were found intact in the debris field and examined.

Just before liftoff, the LOX turbopump in the #8 engine exploded (the pump was recovered from the debris and found to have signs of fire and melting). The resultant shock wave severed surrounding propellant lines and started a fire from leaking fuel. The fire damaged various components in the thrust section leading to the engines gradually being shut down between T+10 and T+12 seconds. The KORD had shut off engines #7, #19, #20, and #21 after detecting abnormal pressure and pump speeds. Telemetry did not provide any explanation as to what shut off the other engines. Engine #18, which had caused the booster to lean over 45 degrees, continued operating until impact, something engineers were never able to satisfactorily explain. It could not be determined exactly why the #8 turbopump had exploded. Working theories were that either a piece of a pressure sensor had broken off and lodged in the pump, or that its impeller blades had rubbed against the metal casing, creating a friction spark that ignited the LOX. The #8 engine had operated erratically prior to shutdown and a pressure sensor detected "incredible force" in the pump. Vasily Mishin believed that a pump rotor had disintegrated, but Kuznetsov argued that the NK-15 engines were entirely blameless and Mishin, who had defended the use of Kuznetsov's engines two years earlier, could not publicly come out and challenge him. Kuznetsov succeeded in getting the postflight investigative committee to rule the cause of the engine failure as "ingestion of foreign debris". Vladimir Barmin, chief director of launch facilities at Baikonur, also argued that the KORD should be locked for the first 15–20 seconds of flight to prevent a shutdown command from being issued until the booster had cleared the pad area. The destroyed complex was photographed by American satellites, disclosing that the Soviet Union was building a Moon rocket. After this flight, fuel filters were installed in later models. It also took 18 months to rebuild the launch pad and delayed launches. The explosion was visible that evening 35 kilometres (22 miles) away at Leninsk (See Tyuratam).

Third failure, serial 6L
June 26, 1971: serial number 6L – dummy Soyuz 7K-LOK (Soyuz 7K-L1E No.1) and dummy LK module-spacecraft

Soon after lift-off, due to unexpected eddies and counter-currents at the base of Block A (the first stage), the N-1 experienced an uncontrolled roll beyond the capability of the control system to compensate. The KORD computer sensed an abnormal situation and sent a shutdown command to the first stage, but as noted above, the guidance program had since been modified to prevent this from happening until 50 seconds into launch. The roll, which had initially been 6° per second, began rapidly accelerating. At T+39 seconds, the booster was rolling at nearly 40° per second, causing the inertial guidance system to go into gimbal lock and at T+48 seconds, the vehicle disintegrated from structural loads. The interstage truss between the second and third stages twisted apart and the latter separated from the stack and at T+50 seconds, the cutoff command to the first stage was unblocked and the engines immediately shut down. The upper stages impacted about 7 kilometers (4 miles) from the launch complex. Despite the engine shutoff, the first and second stages still had enough momentum to travel for some distance before falling to earth about 15 kilometers (9 miles) from the launch complex and blasting a  crater in the steppe. This N1 had dummy upper stages without the rescue system. The next, last vehicle would have a much more powerful stabilization system with dedicated engines (in the previous versions stabilization was done by directing exhaust from the main engines). The engine control system would also be reworked, increasing the number of sensors from 700 to 13,000.

Fourth failure, serial 7L
November 23, 1972: serial number 7L – regular Soyuz 7K-LOK (Soyuz 7K-LOK No.1) and dummy LK module-spacecraft for Moon flyby

The start and lift-off went well. At T+90 seconds, a programmed shutdown of the core propulsion system (the six center engines) was performed to reduce structural stress on the booster. Because of excessive dynamic loads caused by a hydraulic shock wave when the six engines were shut down abruptly, lines for feeding fuel and oxidizer to the core propulsion system burst and a fire started in the boattail of the booster; in addition, the #4 engine exploded. The first stage broke up starting at T+107 seconds and all telemetry data ceased at T+110 seconds. The launch escape system activated and pulled the Soyuz 7K-LOK to safety. The upper stages were ejected from the stack and crashed into the steppe. An investigation revealed that the abrupt shutdown of the engines led to fluctuations in the fluid columns of the feeder pipes, which ruptured and spilled fuel and oxidizer onto the shut down, but still hot, engines. A failure of the #4 engine turbopump was also suspected. It was believed that the launch could have been salvaged had ground controllers sent a manual command to jettison the first stage and begin second stage burn early as the stage failed only 15 seconds before it was due to separate at T+125 seconds and it had reached the nominal burn time of 110 seconds according to the cyclogram.

Canceled fifth launch
Vehicle serial number 8L was prepared for August 1974. It included a regular 7K-LOK Soyuz 7K-LOK and a regular LK module-spacecraft of the L3 lunar expedition complex. It was intended for a Moon flyby and uncrewed landing in preparation for a future crewed mission. As the N1-L3 program was canceled in May 1974, this launch never took place.

Confusion on L3 designation
There is confusion among Russian online sources as to whether N1-L3 (Russian: Н1-Л3) or N1-LZ (Russian: Н1-ЛЗ) was intended, because of the similarity of the Cyrillic letter Ze for "Z" and the numeral "3". Sometimes both forms are used within the same Russian website (or even the same article). English sources refer only to N1-L3. The correct designation is L3, representing one of the five branches of Soviet lunar exploration. Stage 1 (Л1) was planned as a crewed circumlunar flight (partially realized in the Zond program); stage 2 (Л2) was an uncrewed lunar rover (realized in Lunokhod); stage 3 (Л3)  was to have been a crewed lunar landing; stage 4 (Л4)  was conceptualized as a crewed spacecraft in lunar orbit; and stage 5 (Л5) was conceptualized as a heavy crewed lunar rover to support a crew of 3–5 people.

See also
 Comparison of orbital launch systems
 Comparison of orbital launchers families
 Nova (rocket)
 R-56
 Space Launch System
 UR-700

Notes

References

Bibliography

External links 

 Astronautix history of the N1
 Statistics and information. Interactive model.
 Video footage of N-1 vehicle 5L failure with launch abort system activated
 Raketno-kosmicheskii kompleks N1-L3, book: Гудилин В.Е., Слабкий Л.И. (Gudilin V., Slabkiy L.) "Ракетно-космические системы (История. Развитие. Перспективы)", М., 1996 (Слабкий Л.И.) (in Russian)
 Interview with Vasily Pavlovich Mishin (in Russian)
 Kistler Space Systems the US company developing an NK-33 based rocket
Drawing

1969 in spaceflight
1969 in the Soviet Union
1971 in spaceflight
1971 in the Soviet Union
Exploration of the Moon
Missions to the Moon
Soviet lunar program
Space launch vehicles of the Soviet Union
Space accidents and incidents in the Soviet Union